A. E. Taplin Apartment Building is a historic apartment building located at High Point, Guilford County, North Carolina. It was built in 1920, and is a three-story, stuccoed frame Mission Revival style building housing five apartments. It has a low hipped roof, a pair of arched entry doors within a semi-circular arch, and a second-level balcony of black wrought iron.

It was listed on the National Register of Historic Places in 1996.  It is located in the Uptown Suburbs Historic District.

References

Buildings and structures in High Point, North Carolina
Residential buildings on the National Register of Historic Places in North Carolina
Mission Revival architecture in North Carolina
Residential buildings completed in 1920
Buildings and structures in Guilford County, North Carolina
National Register of Historic Places in Guilford County, North Carolina
Historic district contributing properties in North Carolina
Apartment buildings on the National Register of Historic Places